Major General Sir Casimir Cartwright van Straubenzee,  (11 November 1867 – 28 March 1956) was a Canadian-born officer in the British Army, who served as General Officer Commanding Singapore and Malaya Command. In 1900, he played cricket for Canada.

Early life and family
Born in Kingston, Ontario, van Straubenzee was the third son of Colonel Bowen van Straubenzee (1829–1898), a native of Spennithorne, Yorkshire, and his wife, Anne Macaulay Cartwright, daughter of The Hon. John Solomon Cartwright, of Kingston, Ontario. He was a nephew of General Sir Charles van Straubenzee, Commander of British Troops in China and Hong Kong and Governor of Malta.

Military career
Van Straubenzee was educated at Trinity College School, Port Hope, and the Royal Military College of Canada (RMC) in Kingston, Ontario. He joined the Royal Artillery and served with the 4th Ashanti expedition (1895–96) before returning to Canada as a professor on the RMC staff from 1898 to 1903, with the local rank of major from 18 August 1898, and was promoted to the substantive rank of major on 27 February 1902. He was promoted lieutenant colonel and served during the First World War from 1914. He was awarded the French Croix de guerre, and was Inspector-General of the Royal Artillery from 1917 to 1918. Promoted to major general in 1919, he became General Officer Commanding Singapore and then became General Officer Commanding 46th (North Midland) Division in June 1923. In 1927 he went on to be General Officer Commanding the Malaya Command, a command of British Commonwealth forces formed in the 1920s for the coordination of the defences of Malaya and Singapore, before retiring in February 1929.

Cricket
Van Straubenzee played cricket for the Royal Engineers from 1892 to 1908, and one first-class game in 1899 for the Marylebone Cricket Club. He also played for Canada in 1900. He was the author of  Recollections of Sportsmen and Sport in Days of Yore. In 1909, he married Ethel Purcell VanKoughnet (d.1949), whose father, Mathew Robert VanKoughnet (1824–1874), was a first cousin of van Straubenzee's mother – sharing a common ancestor in James Macaulay. She was a niece of Philip Michael Matthew Scott VanKoughnet and the sister of Mrs Frederick Edmund Meredith. They lived between London and Bath. He died 28 March 1956, Lansdown, Bath, Somerset.

Legacy
Van Straubenzee was the sitter for two of the portraits in the National Gallery, London.

Straubenzee, the fictional maker of Colonel Sebastian Moran's air-gun in Sherlock Holmes' 'The Adventure of the Empty House', is identified as Major General Casimir Cartwright Van Straubenzee (1866–1956).

References

|-
 

1867 births
1956 deaths
Royal Artillery officers
Canadian military personnel from Ontario
Companions of the Order of the Bath
Canadian Knights Commander of the Order of the British Empire
Companions of the Order of St Michael and St George
Military of Singapore under British rule
British Army generals of World War I
Royal Military College of Canada alumni
Grand Officers of the Order of Aviz
Canadian cricketers
Cricketers from Ontario
Marylebone Cricket Club cricketers
Casimir Cartwright
Academic staff of the Royal Military College of Canada